The 2013 Eastern Michigan Eagles football team represented Eastern Michigan University in the 2013 NCAA Division I FBS football season. The Eagles played their home games at Rynearson Stadium and were a member of the West Division of the Mid-American Conference. The team was led by fifth year head coach Ron English through the first nine games of the season (posting a 1–8 record). English was fired mid-season and replaced on an interim basis by Stan Parrish, previously the team's offensive coordinator.

Schedule

Source: Schedule

Game Summaries

Howard

Penn State

Rutgers

Ball State

Buffalo

Army

Ohio

Northern Illinois

Toledo

Western Michigan

Bowling Green

Central Michigan

References

Eastern Michigan
Eastern Michigan Eagles football seasons
Eastern Michigan Eagles football